Feed Me is a 2013 Chinese drama film directed by Yang Yazhou and Yang Bo. It was shown at the Montreal World Film Festival on August 29, 2013, and was released in China on May 22, 2015.

Cast
Yu Nan
Tao Zeru
Lin Hao
Vivian Wu

Reception
The film won the Prix de l’innovation (Innovation award) at the 2013 Montreal World Film Festival.

By May 23, 2015, the film had earned  at the Chinese box office.

References

External links

Chinese drama films
2013 drama films
2013 films
2010s Mandarin-language films